Miss Venezuela 1990 was the 37th Miss Venezuela pageant, was held in Caracas, Venezuela on February 1, 1990, after weeks of events. The winner of the pageant was Andreína Goetz, Miss Bolívar.

The pageant was broadcast live on Venevision from the Poliedro de Caracas in Caracas. At the conclusion of the final night of competition, outgoing titleholder Eva Lisa Ljung, crowned Andreína Goetz of Bolívar as the new Miss Venezuela. Bárbara Palacios and Rebecca de Alba joined the hosting team for that year's edition.

Results
Miss Venezuela 1990 - Andreína Goetz (Miss Bolívar)
Miss World Venezuela 1990 - Sharon Luengo (Miss Costa Oriental) 
Miss Flower Queen Venezuela 1990 - Chiquinquirá Delgado (Miss Zulia)
Miss Venezuela International 1990 - Vanessa Holler (Miss Portuguesa) 
Miss Wonderland Venezuela 1990 - Stefania Bacco (Miss Mérida)

The runners-up were:
1st runner-up - Yormery Ortega (Miss Miranda)
2nd runner-up - Carime Bohórquez (Miss Sucre)
3rd runner-up - Sonia Ruggiero (Miss Monagas)
4th runner-up - Carolina Durán (Miss Falcón)
5th runner-up - Naylú Rincón (Miss Península Goajira)

Special awards
 Miss Photogenic (voted by press reporters) - Sharon Luengo (Miss Costa Oriental)
 Miss Congeniality - Karina Trujillo (Miss Cojedes)
 Miss Elegance - Daniela Lores (Miss Trujillo)

Delegates
The Miss Venezuela 1990 delegates are:

Miss Amazonas - Josceline Anita Bazán Bounecarde
Miss Apure - Julieta Diana Buitrago Pinzón
Miss Aragua - Mariangela Fiore Ordonez
Miss Barinas - Dayrí Pérez Recibe
Miss Bolívar - Andreina Katarina Goetz Blohm
Miss Carabobo - Delsy Blasco de Michelena
Miss Cojedes - Karina Isabella Trujillo Tugues
Miss Costa Oriental - Sharon Raquel Luengo González
Miss Delta Amacuro - Rebeca Galindo
Miss Dependencias Federales - Nairobis Yebelkys Cedeño Ortega
Miss Distrito Federal - Angela Giada Fuste Lamarca 
Miss Falcón - Carolina Durán Canal
Miss Guárico - Bertha Elena (Talena) Ollarves Herrera
Miss Lara - Beycis Oscarina Terán Puerta
Miss Mérida - Stefania Denise Bacco Brenzini
Miss Miranda - Yormery Alexandra Ortega Sánchez
Miss Monagas - Sonia Osneiry Ruggiero Mouriño
Miss Municipio Libertador - Maria Rosa Blumetti Blade
Miss Municipio Vargas - Zoraida Cristina Contreras Noguera
Miss Nueva Esparta -  Fadia Bazzi Brogh
Miss Península Goajira - Naylú Lilian Rincón Rodríguez
Miss Portuguesa - Vanessa Cristina Holler Noel
Miss Sucre - Carime Marlene Bohórquez Awad 
Miss Táchira - Maria José Rodríguez Stichiotti
Miss Trujillo - Daniela Paula Lores Quintero 
Miss Yaracuy - Leslie Shaneyla Estrada Lago
Miss Zulia - María Chiquinquirá Delgado Díaz

External links
Miss Venezuela official website

1990 beauty pageants
1990 in Venezuela